The 2019–20 Coppa Italia Dilettanti Regional Cups make up the qualifying competition to decide which teams take part in the main competition from the group stage. Each region of Italy has a regional cup. The winners of each regional cup qualify for the group stage. This is the list of the regional cups' finals.

Leagues

Abruzzo 
The 18 teams of 2019–20 Eccellenza Abruzzo participated. In the second round is played between a group of three teams, the three winners of the ties of first round. The winner of this group participates in the semifinal. All competitions are two-legged, except for the final. The matches within the second round are single-legged.

Apulia 
The 16 teams of 2019–20 Eccellenza Apulia participated. The tournament is entirely knockout. All ties are two-legged, including the final.

Basilicata 
The 16 teams of Eccellenza Basilicata participated. The tournament is entirely knockout. All ties are two-legged, except the final.

Calabria 
The 16 teams of Eccellenza Calabria and the 32 Eccellenza Calabria teams participated. The 48 teams are divided into 16 groups of three. The winners of each group qualify for the knock-out stage. All ties are single-legged, except the semi-finals.

Campania 
The 36 teams of Eccellenza Campania participated. The teams are divided into 12 groups of three. Group winners and top 4 runners-up qualify for the knock-out stage. All ties are two-legged, except the final.

Emilia-Romagna 
The 36 teams of Eccellenza Emilia-Romagna participated. The teams are divided into 12 groups of three. The winners of the 12 groups are divided into four further groups of three. The winners of the second group stage qualify for the knockout stage, consisting of the semi-finals and the final. The semi-finals are two-legged, and the final is single-legged.

Friuli Venezia Giulia 
The 16 teams of Eccellenza Friuli Venezia Giulia participated. The tournament is entirely knockout. All ties are two-legged, except for the final. For two-legged matches, the away goals rule does not apply.

Lazio 
The 36 teams of Eccellenza Lazio participated. Eight teams play in a preliminary round. The winners of that round and the 28 teams that received a bye for the previous round enter the round of 32. All matches are two-legged, except the final.

Liguria 
The 16 teams of Eccellenza Liguria participated. The 16 teams are divided into four groups of four. The group winners qualify for the knock-out stage. The semi-finals are two-legged; the final is single-legged.

Lombardy 
The 48 teams of Eccellenza Lombardy participated. The 48 teams are divided into 16 groups of three. The group winners qualify for the knock-out stage. All matches are single-legged.

Marche 
The 16 teams of Eccellenza Marche participated. The tournament is entirely knockout. All matches are two-legged, except the final which is single-legged.

Molise 
The 16 teams of Eccellenza Molise participated. The tournament is entirely knockout. All matches are two-legged, except the final which is single-legged.

Piedmont/Aosta Valley 
The 32 teams of Eccellenza Piedmont/Aosta Valley participated. The tournament is entirely knockout. All matches are two-legged, except the final which is single-legged.

Sardinia 
The 16 teams Eccellenza Sardinia participated. The tournament is entirely knockout. All matches are two-legged, except the final which is single-legged.

Sicily 
The 32 teams of Eccellenza Sicily participated. The tournament is entirely knockout. All matches are two-legged, except the final which is single-legged.

Tuscany 
The 32 teams of Eccellenza Tuscany participated. The tournament is entirely knockout. All matches are single-legged, except the round of 32 which is two-legged.

Trentino-Alto Adige/Südtirol 
The 48 teams of Eccellenza Trentino-Alto Adige/Südtirol participated. The tournament is divided into two paths. The path of the province of Trento and that of the province of Bolzano. The path of Bolzano include 24 teams divided into eight groups of three. Group stage winners qualify for the knock-out stage, starting with the round of 16. All ties are single-legged. The Trentino path include 24 teams divided into six groups of four. The group winners and the best two runners-up qualify for the knock-out stage. The quarter-finals and semi-finals are two-leg while the final is single-legged. The winners of the Trentino path and the Bolzano path qualify for the regional final of the tournament.

Umbria 
The 16 teams of Eccellenza Umbria participated. The 16 teams are divided into four groups of four. The group winners qualify for the knock-out stage. The semi-finals are two-legged while the final is single-legged.

Veneto 
The 32 teams of Eccellenza Veneto participated. The 32 teams are divided into eight groups of four. The group winners qualify for the knock-out stage. The semi-finals are two-legged while the quarter-finals and final are a single-legged.

References 

2019–20 in Italian football
2019–20 Coppa Italia Dilettanti